Mathew Davison (January 4, 1839 – September 9, 1918) was a Michigan politician.

Early life
His first business was a clothing business.  He was one of the area's largest landowners, owning large amounts of farm land.  He served as the long time cashier of the Union Trust and Savings Bank.

Political life
He was elected as the Mayor of the City of Flint in 1885 serving a 1-year term.

Post-political life
By 1916, Davison was chairman of the board of Union Trust and Savings Bank.

References

Mayors of Flint, Michigan
1839 births
1918 deaths
19th-century American politicians